Adrian Tabarcea Petre (born 11 February 1998) is a Romanian professional footballer who plays as a striker.

Career
On 3 October 2020, Petre joined Italian Serie B club Cosenza on a season-long loan with an option to buy.

Personal life
Petre is named Tabarcea after the former Petrolul Ploieşti player Constantin Tabarcea who died on the field while playing a match at age 26.

Career statistics

Club

Honours 

FCSB

 Cupa României: 2019–20

References

External links

1998 births
Living people
Sportspeople from Arad, Romania
Romanian footballers
Association football forwards
Liga I players
Liga II players
Danish Superliga players
Danish 1st Division players
Super League Greece players
Serie B players
FC UTA Arad players 
Esbjerg fB players
FC Steaua București players
Cosenza Calcio players
FCV Farul Constanța players
Levadiakos F.C. players
Romania youth international footballers
Romania under-21 international footballers
Romanian expatriate footballers
Expatriate men's footballers in Denmark
Expatriate footballers in Italy
Expatriate footballers in Greece
Romanian expatriate sportspeople in Denmark
Romanian expatriate sportspeople in Italy
Romanian expatriate sportspeople in Greece